Silent Steel is a 1995 submarine simulator computer game by Tsunami Games. It was created during the influx of interactive movies during the 1990s. The game is composed almost entirely of live-action full motion video, with sparse computer-generated graphics depicting external shots of the boat during torpedo attacks and atmospheric fly-bys. A version playable on DVD players was released in 1999, following from a DVD-ROM version in 1997. The DVD-ROM version was the first video game formatted for DVD.

A sequel, Silent Steel 2, was announced by Tsunami for release in 1997, but it was cancelled.

Gameplay
The gameplay consists of choosing from three options when the video pauses at certain points. Once the player chooses, the video resumes. This creates several possible plotlines and outcomes. Most of these result in the destruction of the player's submarine; only two distinct threads lead to victory.

Plot
The player commands the USS Idaho, a fictional Ohio-class ballistic missile submarine. On a routine nuclear deterrence patrol, an encoded message is received from U.S. COMSUBLANT. The message reports that a stolen Libyan diesel sub has exited the Mediterranean Sea, possibly heading into Idahos area of operations. Idaho must evade the potentially hostile submarine, a problem that is quickly complicated by the fact that the enemy submarine is equipped with sound-generating equipment that allows her to mimic other classes of submarine, including those of American design. The rogue Kilo uses this tactic to launch a torpedo attack on the Idaho by pretending to be an allied Los Angeles-class sub, USS Biloxi.

After escaping the initial battle, a radio consultation with an American carrier battle group commander confirms that there are no other allied submarines operating in the area, and that a second hostile sub, a Russian Akula-class attack boat that has also gone rogue, is approaching the area. In addition to this, Idaho'''s sonar officer notices that Idaho seems to be emitting a low-frequency sonar signal that he cannot account for.

After a conference with Idahos executive officer and master chief, further engagements commence, where Idaho eventually triumphs through subterfuge and risk-taking. Taking advantage of the lull in combat before the Akula-class submarine comes into torpedo range, a search of Idahos outer hull reveals an act of sabotage instigated by one of the crew working for the enemy.

Engaging the Akula in a torpedo battle, Idaho'' gains the upper hand by the timely interference of an American ASW helicopter tracking the battle and manages to win the fight.

The game was directed by Tony Marks and the script was written by Chuck Pfarrer.

Production

Shooting locations
All sound stage studio filming was conducted in a modified warehouse on the former Charleston Naval Shipyard in North Charleston, South Carolina. All submarine and ship footage was shot aboard the USS Clamagore (SS-343) submarine and the USS Laffey (DD-724) destroyer which are both museum ships at the Patriots Point Naval Museum in Mt. Pleasant, South Carolina.

Cast
 Brian McNamara as Executive Officer
 Jim Metzler as Master Chief
 Fred Lehneg as Lt. Wheeler
 John Short as Ensign Foster
 Charles McLawhorn as Admiral Plaskett
 Joy Parry as Deputy Director Matthews
 Frank Leslie as Officer of the Deck
 James Middleton as Weapons Officer
 Keith Woullard as Chief Engineer
 Mike Kirton as Bubba Holland
 Don Soper as Ice Cream
 John Jarrett as Danny
 Mark Lattanzio as Ensign Neff
 Greg Elliott as Player Voice
 Leigh Murray as Newscast Voice

References

External links

Silent Steel at SubSim.com

1995 video games
Adventure games
Cold War video games
DVD interactive technology
Interactive movie video games
Single-player video games
Submarine simulation video games
Video games developed in the United States
Windows games
Full motion video based games
Tsunami Games games